Twin Waters is a coastal suburb of Maroochydore in the Sunshine Coast Region, Queensland, Australia.

Geography
Twin Waters is bounded by the Maroochy River to the south and the Coral Sea to the south-east.

Due to the L-shape of the suburb, there are three distinct areas: north-west, south-west, and south-east. The south-eastern part of the suburb is predominantly occupied by the conservation park and the Twin Waters Resort (with its own lagoon). The north-west is occupied by the Twin Waters Golf Course with some residential development. The south-west has its own lagoon connected to the Maroochy River and is a mixture of residential development and the conversation park along the river front.

There is a sandy surf beach along the coast with a narrow coastal reserve immediately behind it with a public access road.

History
The Maroochy River Conservation Park was established in 1992.

Twin Waters was originally part of the suburb of Mudjimba and contains a significant canal estate. It was officially named and bounded as a separate suburb on 9 May 2003.

Education 
There are no schools in the suburb. The nearest primary school is Pacific Paradise State School in neighbouring Pacific Paradise to the north-west. The nearest secondary school is Maroochydore State High School in Maroochydore to the south.

Amenities 
There is a boat ramp and floating walkway at Nojoor Road on the north bank of Maroochy River. It is managed by the Sunshine Coast Regional Council.

Attractions 
The Twin Waters Resort is at 270 Ocean Drive. It features 373 rooms situated around a lagoon with conference and reception facilities.

Twin Waters Golf Club is at 151 Ocean Drive. It is an 18-hole par-72 championship course. It was designed by champion golfers Peter Thomson and Mike Wolveridge in 1991.

References

External links

 

Suburbs of the Sunshine Coast Region
Maroochydore
Coastline of Queensland